Eastern Orthodoxy in Croatia refers to adherents, religious communities, institutions and organizations of Eastern Orthodox Christianity in Croatia. It is the second-largest religious denomination in Croatia, behind the Roman Catholic Church. Over 128 000 people, forming 3.32% of the total Croatian population, are Eastern Orthodox Christians (2021).

Eastern Orthodoxy in Croatia is represented foremost by the Serbian Orthodox Church, which claims most of the Eastern Orthodox Christian faithful. Other major jurisdictions are the Bulgarian Orthodox and Macedonian Orthodox Churches. These three churches are recognized by the state. In Croatia there are also adherents to the Montenegrin Orthodox Church. In Croatia there also exists the Croatian Orthodox Church.

Statistics

The published data from the 2011 Croatian census included a crosstab of ethnicity and religion, which showed that a total of 190,143 Orthodox believers (4.5% of the total population) was divided between the following ethnic groups:
 159,530 Serbs
 16,647 Croats
 2,401 Macedonians
 2,381 Romani
 1,822 Montenegrins
 729 Russians
 341 Ukrainians
 293 Bosniaks
 158 Bulgarians
 147 Romanians
 other individual ethnicities (under 100 people each)

Serbian Orthodox Church in Croatia

This church gathers its faithful among the Serbs of Croatia. Five eparchies (dioceses) of the Serbian Orthodox Church cover the territory of Croatia:
 Metropolitanate of Zagreb and Ljubljana, headed by metropolitan Porfirije Perić, since 2014.
 Eparchy of Dalmatia, headed by bishop Nikodim Kosović, since 2017.
 Eparchy of Gornji Karlovac, headed by bishop Gerasim Popović, since 2004.
 Eparchy of Osječko polje and Baranja, administered by bishop Irinej Bulović of Bačka, since 2017.
 Eparchy of Slavonia, headed by bishop Jovan Ćulibrk, since 2014.

Regional Council of Serbian Orthodox Church in Croatia consists of all five diocesan bishops. The Council is presided by the Metropolitan of Zagreb and Ljubljana.

Major Serbian Orthodox sites include the monasteries:
 Dragović
 Gomirje
 Komogovina
 Krka
 Krupa
 Lepavina
 Sv. Lazarica
 Sv. Nedjelje
 Sv. Petke
 Sv. Vasilija Ostroškog
and the churches:

See also
 Religion in Croatia
 Croatian Orthodox Church, a World War II organization
 List of Serbian Orthodox churches in Croatia

References

Sources

 
 
 
 
 
 

 
Serbian Orthodox Church in Croatia